Varkala,  is a major coastal municipality situated in the northern suburb of Trivandrum, capital city of the Indian state of Kerala. It is the headquarters of Varkala Taluk and important government institutions such as the taluk office, court complex, office of the Deputy Superintendent of Police, Legal Metrology Inspector office, Excise Circle and Range office, RTO, Treasury and Mini civil station are situated in here. It is one among the oldest municipalities of Kerala established on 1980.

Varkala is the only region in southern Kerala where cliffs are found adjacent to the Arabian Sea. These Cenozoic sedimentary formation cliffs are a unique geological feature on the otherwise flat Kerala coast, and are known among geologists as Varkala Formation. The cliffs have been declared a national geological monument by the Geological Survey of India for their protection, maintenance, promotion, and the enhancement of geotourism. There are numerous water spouts and spas on the sides of these cliffs. In 2015, the Ministry of Mines, the Government of India, and the Geological Survey of India (GSI) declared Varkala Cliffs a geo-heritage site.

Varkala is also known for the 2,000-year-old Janardana Swami Temple, which is an important Vaishnavaite shrine in India and is often referred to as Dakshin Kashi (Benares of the South).  The temple is located close to Papanasam beach, which is an Ayurveda treatment centre. The temple has an ancient bell removed from a shipwreck, donated by the captain of the Dutch vessel which sank near Varkala without causing any casualties.

Another major landmark in Varkala is the Sivagiri Mutt, established by the social reformer Sree Narayana Guru.

History

Legends
It is believed that a Pandyan King was instructed by Lord Brahma to build a temple at this very place to redeem him of his sins. Several other myths abound on the birth of Varkala. Another legend states that when a group of pilgrims approached Sage Narada and told him that they had sinned, Narada threw his  (a loin cloth made from the bark of a tree) and it landed at this scenic village and hence, the place came to be known as Varkala. Narada told the pilgrims to pray for their redemption at Papanasam, which literally means redemption from sins.

Geography

Religion

As per the Census 2011, the total Hindu population in Varkala municipality is 28,273 which is 70.6% of the total population. Also the total Muslim population in Varkala is 11,562 which is 28.87% of the total population

Geology

Varkala is an important place as far as geology is concerned as it exposes sedimentary rocks belonging to the Cenozoic age, popularly known in the geological literature as the Warkalli formation. The Warkalli formation, along with the Quilon formation, represent sediments laid down in the Kerala basin that existed during Mio-pliocene times. The Quilon formation of the Miocene age is made up of limestone, and the Warkalli formation is made up of alternating beds of sand and shale exposed along the Varkala cliffs. Thin seams of lignite in the shale of the Warkalli formation suggest good vegetation at the time of deposition of the clay sediments.

Government and politics

Local Government
Varkala is a municipality in the Thiruvananthapuram District. Urban civic administration is overseen by the Varkala municipality or municipal council, while the rural civic administration is under the charge of the 7 panchayats of Edava, Elakamon, Vettoor, Madavoor, Navaikulam, Pallickal, and Chemmaruthy in Varkala Taluk.

The Varkala Municipality has 33 wards under it and also has 6 standing committees that take care of basic amenities such as water, sewage, roads, taxes, and other such city or local government functions.

Elected representatives to the State Assembly  and to the Indian Parliament
Varkala comes under the Attingal Lok Sabha Constituency. There are seven State Assembly Constituencies within Attingal Lok Sabha Constituency, of which Varkala is one. One Member of the Legislative Assembly (MLA) is elected from Varkala with Legislative Assembly no. 127.

Economy
Varkala is a well-known tourism and commercial destination. More than 300 resorts and hotels are situated in the municipality, including a Taj Hotel, owned by Tata Group. The city has an average-rated water supply system, fire station, automobile showrooms, several post offices, engineering and degree colleges and a police station. It also has government-run medical facilities in addition to over 10 private hospitals and clinics. A government-run naturopathic hospital is located near the Papanasam cliff. The District Ayurvedic Hospital is located in Varkala.

Varkala is an important hub for neighbouring places like Attingal, Kadakkavur, Chirayinkeezhu, Kallambalam, Paravur, and Kilimanoor.

Transport
 
Air

Trivandrum International Airport (39 km) is the nearest airport and is well connected with all major cities in India and Abroad and there is also a helipad at Varkala Cliff.

Rail

Varkala Railway Station, the second busiest and third highest revenue-generating station in Thiruvananthapuram district, is well connected by regular trains from to major metropolitan cities in India like Mumbai, Delhi, Bangalore, Pune, Chennai, Hyderabad, Goa, Kolkata,Vishakapatnam etc.

Road

Varkala is situated along the Trivandrum - Kollam coastal highway. It is also connected by the State Highway 64 with the Mumbai-Kanyakumari National Highway 66 which runs at 9 km towards the east. Private buses and KSRTC buses ply along NH 66 and through Varkala from Thiruvananthapuram city, Attingal, Parippally and Kollam city.

Water

Varkala is connected to National Waterway 3 through Varkala Tunnel, which passes through the heart of the city.

Tourism

Tourism began to thrive at the end of the last century at Varkala beach (Papanasam), which was earlier famous for Vavu Beli, a Hindu custom performed at the beach. Another beach is at Tiruvambadi, one kilometre away and on the way to the old palace. An island called Ponnumthuruthu is close to Varkala and is also a tourist attraction.

Many ayurvedic massage parlours line the promenade above the beach.

Varkala Beach

Varkala Beach, or Papanasam Beach, is a heaven for sunbathing and swimming. It also offers adventurous activities in water sports. Special authentic Kerala style local food can also be experienced along the cliff. The cliff and the beach include resorts, restaurants, and other shops.
The black part of the sand on Varkala Beach contains Thorium-oxide, which is a radioactive substance. Thorium and Thorium-oxide and its isotopes are found all over Kerala and can be identified by their black colour.

Cremations

Sections of Varkala Beach (Papanasam Beach) are used by Indians to scatter the ashes of their cremated relatives into the sea. Despite this burial activity, the sea is popular with swimmers both local and foreign.

Kappil Lake

This serene estuary meanders through dense coconut groves before merging into the Arabian Sea. The bridge over the lake is a vantage point to view the backwater stretching white and grey to the distant blue horizon. Boating is another way to browse this waterway.

Anjengo Fort
Anjengo Fort is a fort near Varkala. The historic significance tagged to Anjengo comes through foreign powers like the Portuguese, the Dutch, and finally the English East India Company. In the year 1684, the English East India Company chose Anjengo to establish their first trade settlement in Kerala. At Anjengo, one can find the remnants of the old English Fort, which was targeted several times by other foreign powers, who were at that time fighting each other to get a firm footing in Kerala. The fort is now under the protection of National Heritage Monuments. There is also a cemetery inside the fort and the oldest burial site dates to 1704. Muthalapuzhi Lake is situated in Anjengo.

Varkala Tunnel

Varkala Tunnel is an old tourist highlight. Its construction began in 1867 under the supervision of Travancore Diwan Sir. T Mahadeva Rao and was completed only in 1880, at the time of Diwan Sheshaya Sasthri. Varkala Lighthouse is another tourist highlight in the vicinity.

Religious centres

Janardana Swami Temple

Janardana Swami Temple is a very important Vaishnavite shrine and attracts thousands of pilgrims. The temple is about 2,000 years old. Facing the temple is Papasnanam Beach, where devotees take a bath in the belief that the sacred waters will wash away their sins. A large bell washed up from the wreck of a Dutch merchant vessel is kept on display at the temple.

Sivagiri Mutt
Sivagiri Mutt is a famous ashram in Varkala, founded by the philosopher and social reformer Sree Narayana Guru. Sree Narayana Guru's tomb is also located here. The samadhi (the final resting place) of the Guru attracts thousands of devotees every year during the Sivagiri pilgrimage, from December 30 to January 1. The Sivagiri Mutt, built in 1904, is situated at the top of the Sivagiri hill in Varkala. The Sivagiri Mutt is also the headquarters of the Sree Narayana Dharma Sangham, an organization of his disciples and saints, established by the Guru to propagate his concept of 'One Caste, One Religion, One God'. The Guru Deva Jayanti, the birthday of the Guru, and the samadhi day, are celebrated in August and September respectively every year. Colourful processions, debates and seminars, public meetings, cultural shows, community feasts, group weddings, and rituals mark the celebrations.

Panayara Triporittakkavu Bhagavathi Temple

Panayara Triporittakkavu Bhagavathi Temple is one of the most famous Devi temples in Kerala. 
Meenabharani festival is the primary festival in Porittakkavu temple, celebrating the month of ‘Meenam’ (March/April) in the Malayalam calendar.

Sarkara Devi Temple
Sarkara Devi Temple is an old temple situated near Varkala at Chirayinkeezhu. The temple is famous for the Kaliyoot festival on the Malayalam month of Kumbham (March).

Sree Saraswathy Temple
The Sree Saraswathy Temple, located in Venkulam, Edava, is a VidyaDevi temple known for Navarathri Sangeetholsavam and Vijayadesami Vidyarambam.

Kaduvayil Juma Masjid
Kaduvayil Juma mosque, situated on NH47, between Kallambalam and Attingal, is a Sunni pilgrimage centre which attracts local Muslims.

Climate
The Köppen-Geiger climate classification system classifies Varkala's climate as tropical monsoon. It has heavy rains during June–August due to a southwest monsoon.

See also
 Kovalam lighthouse beach

References

 
Tourist attractions in Thiruvananthapuram
Cities and towns in Thiruvananthapuram district
Populated coastal places in India